Denys Poyatsyka (born April 29, 1985 in Krementschuk, Poltava Oblast) is a Ukrainian amateur boxer, best known for winning the European title at 201 lbs in 2006.

Career
Poyatsyka started to box in 1995. In 2004 he was still competing at middleweight then he moved up to light heavy but wasn't the #1 in his country.

In 2006 he moved up to heavyweight with limit 201 lbs and won the national title therefore he was sent to the Euro championships.
Here he surprised everyone by not only winning the whole tournament but by displaying tremendous punching power, even managing to stop four out of five foes including Elchin Alizade and usually durable Russian top favorite Roman Romanchuk.

Afterwards he couldn't  repeat this triumph, 2007 he was outpointed by Alizade at the world championships in Chicago and didn't medal. In addition to this he wasn't sent to the Olympics and was replaced by Oleksandr Usyk.
At the Euros 2008 he was beaten by Armenian Colak Ananikyan

At the 2010 European Amateur Boxing Championships in Moscow, Russia he won the bronze medal, in the Semis he lost to Egor Mekhontsev from Russia.

External links
Euro 2006
Euro 2008

1985 births
Living people
People from Kremenchuk
Heavyweight boxers
Ukrainian male boxers
Sportspeople from Poltava Oblast
21st-century Ukrainian people